The Mosely-Woods House (a.k.a. Starling-Wilburn House) is a historic house in Yazoo City, Mississippi.

History
The house was built circa 1860. Two decades later, in 1880, it was acquired by William Mosely, a black landowner, from Ann Holt.

Heritage significance
It has been listed on the National Register of Historic Places since June 25, 2005.

References

Houses on the National Register of Historic Places in Mississippi
Houses in Yazoo County, Mississippi
National Register of Historic Places in Yazoo County, Mississippi